Salcito is a comune (municipality) in the Province of Campobasso in the Italian region Molise, located about  northwest of Campobasso.

Salcito borders the following municipalities: Bagnoli del Trigno, Civitanova del Sannio, Fossalto, Pietracupa, Poggio Sannita, San Biase, Sant'Angelo Limosano, Schiavi di Abruzzo, Trivento.

References

Cities and towns in Molise